Michaele Schreyer (born 9 August 1951 in Cologne) is a German politician of Alliance 90/The Greens who served as a European Commissioner from September 1999 to November 2004, holding the budget portfolio.

Education
Schreyer wrote her doctoral thesis on tax federalism at the University of Cologne.

Political career
From 1983 until 1987, Schreyer worked as an advisor on financial policy to the Green Party's parliamentary group in the Bundestag.

In 1989, Schreyer was appointed State Minister for Urban Development in the government of Governing Mayor Walter Momper of Berlin. In the 1990 state elections, she was elected to the Abgeordnetenhaus of Berlin. Between 1995 and 1997, she served as chairwoman of the Sub-Committee on Public Housing. In 1998, she assumed the leadership of the Green Party's parliamentary group, alongside Renate Künast.

European Commissioner, 2000–2004
In 2000, Germany's Chancellor Gerhard Schröder nominated Schreyer, alongside Günter Verheugen, as one of two German members of the European Commission under President Romano Prodi. In the Prodi Commission, Schreyer took on an enlarged portfolio for control of the 80 billion euro ($83.73 billion) budget of the European Union.

During Schreyer's time in office, the European Commission filed a high-profile civil lawsuit in the United States against Philip Morris International and R. J. Reynolds Tobacco Company seeking damages for what it called their involvement with organized crime in smuggling cigarettes into Europe. By 2004, Schreyer and Philip Morris had negotiated a settlement under which the company agreed to pay about $1 billion over 12 years.

Other activities
 European Youth Parliament – Germany, Member of the Board of Trustees
 European Movement Germany, Vice President
 Schwarzkopf Foundation, Member of the Board
 Heinrich Böll Foundation, Member of the Supervisory Board (2007-2014)

Schreyer is co-author (with Lutz Mez) of the publication "ERENE – European Community for Renewable Energy".

References

External links

 Commissioner Michaele Schreyer – Member of the European Commission, web-archive of the EU Commission
 ERENE – European Community for Renewable Energy. A feasibility study by Michaele Schreyer and Lutz Mez. Edited by the Heinrich Böll Foundation

|-

|-

1951 births
Living people
German European Commissioners
Alliance 90/The Greens politicians
Senators of Berlin
Women European Commissioners
20th-century German politicians
21st-century German politicians
20th-century German women politicians
21st-century German women politicians